Rodniki is a rural locality (a village) in Kelteyevsky Selsoviet, Kaltasinsky District, Bashkortostan, Russia. The population was 17 as of 2010. There is 1 street.

Geography 
Rodniki is located 17 km west of Kaltasy (the district's administrative centre) by road.

References 

Rural localities in Kaltasinsky District